Nawab Khair Bakhsh Marri (28 February 1928 – 10 June 2014)) was Pakistani politician from the province of Balochistan in Pakistan.

Early life and career
Khair Bakhsh Marri had received his early education in Kohlu, Balochistan and higher education from Aitchison College, Lahore. Nawab Marri admitted himself in a 2008 interview that he was a 'latecomer' into politics due to the comfortable life he spent at Aitchison College, Lahore and that he was indifferent to politics in his youth. Only when oil and gas exploration started in the Marri tribal areas during General Ayub Khan's regime in Pakistan, his tribal nationalist feelings and political consciousness were aroused.

Government of Pakistan's longstanding view was that these Baloch tribal chiefs are 'anti-development' in their tribal areas and want to cling onto their own traditionally-held power over their people. The tribal chiefs do not want their people to get modern education due to their fear that then the Balochi people would rebel against their own tribal chiefs.

Khair Bakhsh Marri became a member of the National Assembly of Pakistan, after winning a seat from Balochistan in the Pakistani general election, 1970.

He also was a key leader of the 1970s insurgency against the Pakistani government. Due to the steps taken by the federal government to suppress the rebellion by Zulfiqar Ali Bhutto regime in the 1970s, Khair Bakhsh Marri spent many years in exile in Afghanistan, and only returned to Pakistan when the  USSR-backed government of Mohammad Najibullah supporting him in that country, had fallen in the early 1990s.

After returning to Pakistan from his exile, he decided to keep a low profile, but his Baloch nationalist views earned him a label of a 'communist nationalist'.

Death and legacy
Khair Bakhsh Marri died on 10 June 2014 in Karachi, Pakistan at age 86. He was admitted to Liaquat National Hospital, Karachi in a critical condition on 6 June 2014 and had been under treatment there.

Khair Bakhsh Marri had six sons — Balach Marri, Changez Marri, Hyrbyair Marri, Ghazan Marri, Hamza Marri and Mehran Marri.

Khair Bakhsh Marri was also head of the Marri tribe.

See also
 Balochistan
 Nazir Ahmed Marri 
 Brahamdagh Bugti
 Ataullah Mengal
 Ghaus Bakhsh Bizenjo
 Mir Gul Khan Naseer

References

External links
 Exclusive Interview of Brahmdagh Bugti - Some Baloch support sardari system, others democracy by Qurat ul ain Siddiqui, Dawn (newspaper)
 Interview with Khair Bakhsh Marri Rediff.com website, 23 June 2008

1928 births
2014 deaths
Tumandars
Nawabs of Balochistan, Pakistan
Baloch people
Aitchison College alumni
Pakistani Marxists
Khair Bakhsh
Nawabs of Pakistan
Pakistani MNAs 1972–1977